Edward Laverack (born 27 July 1994) is a Welsh cyclist from Llanelli. Predominantly a hill climber, his most notable achievement is winning the 2019 British National Hill Climb Championship in Haytor Vale, Devon, setting a new course record in the process.

Born in Llanelli, Carmarthenshire, Laverack attended Ysgol Bryngwyn. At the age of 14 he was inspired to have a go at cycling having witnessed Nicole Cooke's performance at the 2008 Olympic Games. Having started racing at the age of 17 with Bynea Cycling Club in 2011, Laverack joined British UCI continental cycling team Rapha Condor in 2013. The following year he won the Under 23 British National Road Race Championships, finishing 13th overall. 2019 saw him moving to UCI Continental team SwiftCarbon Pro Cycling.

Major results

2014
 1st  Road race, National Under–23 Road Championships
2019
 1st  National Hill Climb Championships
2023
 1st  Scotland

References

Living people
1994 births
Welsh male cyclists
Sportspeople from Llanelli